The 1894 World Allround Speed Skating Championships took place at 10 and 11 February 1894 at the ice rink Saltsjöbanen in Stockholm, Sweden. 19 skaters from six countries participated. It is the first World Allround Speed Skating Championships skated outside off Amsterdam. The Dutch skater Jaap Eden was the defending champion. No new champion was declared because none of the skaters won three distances.

Allround results 

  * = Fell
 NC = Not classified
 NF = Not finished
 NS = Not started
 DQ = Disqualified
Source: SpeedSkatingStats.com

Rules 
Four distances had to be skated: 500, 1500, 5000 and 10,000 m. One could earn the world title only by winning at least three of the four distances, otherwise the title would be vacant. The winner of the 500 and 1500 meter was decided by a skate off of the best four skaters of the distance. Silver and bronze medals were not awarded.

References 

World Allround Speed Skating Championships, 1894
1894 World Allround
World Allround, 1894
International sports competitions in Stockholm
1894 in Swedish sport
February 1894 sports events
1890s in Stockholm